Metro Newspapers, now known as Weeklys, is an American newspaper company based in San Jose, California.

It publishes five free alternative weekly newspapers in Northern California: Metro Silicon Valley, Good Times, the Pacific Sun, East Bay Express and the North Bay Bohemian; and ten community newspapers: the Gilroy Dispatch', Healdsburg Tribune, the Hollister Free Lance, the King City Rustler, the Los Gatan, the Morgan Hill Times, Salinas Valley Tribune, Aptos Life, The Pajaronian and Press Banner.

Together, the publications reach a weekly audience of about half a million people, according to The Media Audit.  Weeklys also operates digital publishing businesses.

The alt weeklies are free-distribution, tabloid-sized newspapers emphasizing news and analysis, local coverage and in-depth coverage of arts, culture and entertainment. The Gilroy, Morgan Hill, Hollister, Watsonville, Salinas Valley and King City community newspapers are larger format broadsheet publications that are home delivered.

Alternative Weeklies 
The Pacific Sun is the longest published alternative weekly in the United States. https://pacificsun.com/alt-together-now/ 

The Metro weekly began celebrating its 25th year starting in March 2009, making it the most established free weekly in the South Bay Area of Northern California. Metro Silicon Valley was one of the first newspapers to publish Matt Groening's Life in Hell, long before he created The Simpsons, and Rob Brezsny's Real Astrology.

Good Times, founded in 1975, won the top award in the California Journalism Awards two years in a row and is the largest circulation newspaper in Santa Cruz County, California.

The company has been a number of notable alumni, including British television journalist Louis Theroux, New York Times opinion writer Michelle Goldberg, News Director of Vice News Michael Learmonth, typographer Conor Mangat  and film producer Zack Stentz

Community Weeklies

The company first began publishing community newspapers in 1990 with the purchase of the Los Gatos Weekly and Los Gatos Times-Observer, to form the Los Gatos Weekly-Times. During the 1990s the Silicon Valley Community Newspaper group expanded to include Saratoga News, Campbell Reporter, Cupertino Courier, Sunnyvale Sun and the Willow Glen Resident. It was sold to a company executive on Dec. 17, 2001.

Thirteen years later, when Weeklys, then known as Metro Newspapers, acquired Santa Cruz's Good Times on March 31, 2014, it also purchased the seller's Gilroy, Morgan Hill and Hollister newspapers and re-entered the community publishing arena. It later acquired long established titles in Watsonville, Scotts Valley, the Salinas Valley and Healdsburg, and opened a publication in Los Gatos.
 

The Healdsburg rescue attracted national interest after the purchase occurred within days of the 157-year-old publication's shutdown by a nonprofit owner. "We are surprised, gratified and a little astonished," said Nancy Dobbs, president of the board of directors of Sonoma County Local News Initiative, which sold the newspaper's assets to Weeklys.

History 
In 1984 Dan Pulcrano put together a group of local Silicon Valley and entertainment industry investors and recruited LA Weekly executive David Cohen as co-publisher to launch Metro. From on initial circulation of 40,000 it grew to approximately 100,000.

In 1990, Metro acquired Los Gatos Weekly, a newspaper Pulcrano had founded eight years earlier, and the Chicago Tribune-owned Los Gatos Times-Observer. The two were merged to become Los Gatos Weekly-Times. The acquisition was the beginning of Metro's expansion into community journalism.

A second alt weekly, Metro Santa Cruz, began publishing in 1994. The same year, Metro Newspapers purchased the Sonoma County Independent, which, in October 2000, expanded its distribution to cover Napa and Marin counties and is now published under the North Bay Bohemian flag.

In March 2009, on the publication's 15th anniversary, Metro Santa Cruz was renamed Santa Cruz Weekly. In March 2014, Metro Newspapers acquired Good Times, the Gilroy Dispatch, the Hollister Free Lance and the Morgan Hill Times, and merged Good Times and the Santa Cruz Weekly.

In 2015, Metro acquired the Pacific Sun; the Bohemian ceased distribution in Marin County and increased its Sonoma County and Napa County distribution.

In 2020, the company introduced the Weeklys brand, acquired the East Bay Express, launched East Bay magazine and acquired the Scotts Valley-based Press Banner.

The company is operated by its founder and longtime executive editor, Dan Pulcrano.

Silicon Valley Community Newspapers
Metro developed a group of weekly community newspapers, including the Los Gatos Weekly-Times, Saratoga News, Campbell Reporter, Willow Glen Resident and Sunnyvale Sun. Under Metro's ownership, the group won numerous awards, including the California Newspaper Publishers Association's "General Excellence" award in its Better Newspapers Contest. On December 17, 2001, Cohen, a co-founder of Metro, bought the group, which at the time included six publications and left to run Silicon Valley Community Newspapers as an independent company. Cohen sold it three years later to Knight Ridder which sold the group to McClatchy Corp. McClatchy immediately resold SVCN to Dean Singleton's MediaNews Group. In 2014, Bay Area News Group marketing director Erika Brown announced that the newspapers would be distributed to subscribers of the Mercury News, rather than generally to homes in the community.

Early online player
Metro was an early participant in the online publishing revolution, in 1993 launching the Livewire online service, one of the first online efforts by a non-daily newspaper publisher. The service offered free email accounts, online commerce, chats, posting forums, and online articles.

Virtual Valley, a similar service with an emphasis on covering Silicon Valley communities, was launched the following year and helped put the city governments of San Jose, Milpitas and Los Gatos online. Also in 1994, Metro established Boulevards, a network of web sites, each covering a major U.S. metropolitan area, that pre-dated Citysearch and Microsoft's short-lived "Sidewalk" service.

In 1995, Metro launched the online version of the newspaper on the web under the brand Metroactive that  included several of its newspapers papers and later included a downloadable edition in PDF format.

Awards
Metroactive has received several awards for its work, including:
 Six papers in the Metro Newspapers group were honored for writing, editing and design at the California Newspaper Publishers Association Better Newspapers Awards, July 1997.
 Three papers in the Metro Newspapers group won at the National Newspaper Association's 1995 contest, announced September 1996.
 Five papers in the Metro Newspapers group were honored for writing, editing and design at the California Newspaper Publishers Association Better Newspapers Awards, July 1996.
 Metro Silicon Valley won two awards at the California Newspaper Publishers Association Better Newspapers Awards, October 2008.

References

External links
 Metro Silicon Valley
 Good Times
 North Bay Bohemian
 Pacific Sun
 East Bay Express
 San Jose Inside
 Company website

Weekly newspaper companies of the United States
Newspapers published in the San Francisco Bay Area
Companies based in San Jose, California
American companies established in 1985
Weekly newspapers published in California